A number of religious groups, particularly Christians and Muslims, are involved in proselytization of Jews: Attempts to recruit or "missionize" Jews. In response, some Jewish groups have formed counter-missionary organizations to discourage missionary and messianic groups such as Jews for Jesus from using practices that they say are deceptive.

Christian missions

According to Rabbi Tovia Singer, counter-missionary expert and director of Outreach Judaism, there are well over 1,000 messianic congregations and other missions to the Jews worldwide. 

A number of Christian denominations have programs to reach Jews. The JTA, a Jewish news service, conducted an extensive analysis of Christian efforts to convert Jews to Christianity and found that some of the largest evangelical denominations – the Southern Baptists, the Assemblies of God, and the Lutheran Church–Missouri Synod – have all increased their efforts to evangelize Jews in the recent past.

The article states that the Christian missionary organization Jews for Jesus completed a five-year tour called "Behold Your God" that brought its message to 53 cities worldwide, and the Christian Chosen People Ministries saw its income grow by 31% to $7.9 million between 2003 and 2006.

Jews for Judaism, a Jewish counter-missionary group, writes that there are over 900 Christian groups in North America actively involved in missionizing the Jewish people. Jews for Judaism further states that these groups are currently spending over $250 million each year on efforts to convert Jews to Christianity. Jews for Jesus, the best known single ministry to the Jews, spent over $15 million in 2008. The Assemblies of God has an extensive organization targeting Jews for conversion to Christianity.

Israel has more than one hundred Messianic congregations according to Yaakov Shalom Ariel, an associate professor of religious studies at the University of North Carolina and author of Evangelizing The Chosen People.

A prominent effort to convert Jews to Christianity is known as Jews for Jesus. It was founded by Martin "Moishe" Rosen, a Jew who grew up in a non-observant home, converted to Christianity, and was ordained as a Baptist minister in 1957. In 1973, Rosen left the employment of the American Board of Missions to the Jews, now called Chosen People Ministries, to incorporate a separate mission which became known as Jews for Jesus. In 1986, he received an honorary Doctor of Divinity Degree from Western Conservative Baptist Seminary in Portland, Oregon. Jews for Jesus is now led by David Brickner, who has been working for the organization since 1977.

The 19th century saw at least 250,000 Jews convert to Christianity according to existing records of various societies. Data from the Pew Research Center has it that, as of 2013, about 1.6 million adult American Jews identify themselves as Christians; most as Protestants. According to the same data, most of the Jews who identify themselves as some sort of Christian (1.6 million) were raised as Jews or are Jews by ancestry. According to a 2012 study, 17% of Jews in Russia identify themselves as Christians.

Efforts to convert Jews to Christianity are sometimes regarded as antisemitic.  Most Progressive Christian and Mainline Christian denominations have publicly declared that they no longer proselytize Jews. Most evangelical and conservative Christian churches have said they will continue their efforts to evangelize among Jews and claim that proselytism is not antisemitic (even if Jews disagree) .

Muslim missions
Muslims have also targeted Jews for conversion. Rabbi Moshe Cohen, of Yad L'Achim, an Israel-based counter-missionary organization, has identified Al Dawaa, an Israel-based Muslim group headed by Sheikh Abu Yassin of Kafr Manda.

Jewish response

Jewish counter-missionary organizations respond to these efforts by offering personal counseling, web sites with articles addressing common missionary tactics, and discussion forums where Jews who have questions about the differences between Judaism and other religions can be answered by observant Jews.

Some Jewish resources are specifically aimed at countering the missionary efforts aimed at Jews.

 Jews for Judaism is an international organization that provides a wide variety of counseling services, along with education, and outreach programs that enable Jews of all ages to rediscover and strengthen their Jewish heritage. Jews for Judaism has offices in Baltimore, Toronto, Los Angeles, Australia and South Africa. On their website, Jews for Judaism offers many articles discussing missionary tactics towards Jews, approaches by Mormons, Jehovah's Witnesses and various "proof texts" and other arguments often used by missionaries as they evangelize Jews.

 Outreach Judaism, a site run by Rabbi Tovia Singer. Outreach Judaism is an international organization that responds directly to the issues raised by missionaries and cults, by exploring Judaism in contradistinction to fundamentalist Christianity. Outreach Judaism provides full-time, multi-level informational resources.

 Beyneynu - בינינו, is founded by former Evangelical missionary Shannon Nuszen. Beyneynu is a non-profit organization that monitors missionary activity in Israel and abroad. Based in Israel, Beyneynu works with government and community leaders to raise awareness of Jewish evangelism, its danger to the Jewish people, and encourage safe and consistent boundaries in the interfaith relationships of Jewish communities worldwide.

 Kiruv Organization (Mizrachi) - an outreach organization founded in 1995 by Rabbi Yosef Mizrachi in New York for the purpose of teaching Torah to both secular and religious Jews.

Rabbi Moshe Shulman has responded to specific missionaries who target Jews, including Michael Brown, Rachmiel Frydland, Risto Santala, and David H. Stern (author of the Complete Jewish Bible). Rabbi Shulman's website offers scholarly articles on the mis-use of the Targums, Midrash and Talmud by non-Jews who quote from Jewish sources in an attempt to convert Jews.

The leading counter-missionary organization in Israel is Yad L'Achim, an organization focusing on Orthodox Judaism outreach and counter-missionary activity. Yad L'Achim is made up of both paid staff and volunteers, and is largely supported by donations both from Israel and the diaspora.

See also 
 Apostasy in Judaism
 Baal teshuva
 Jewish polemics and apologetics in the Middle Ages
 Jewish views on religious pluralism
 Judaism's view of Jesus
 David Klinghoffer

References

Further reading

 Let's Get Biblical!: Why doesn't Judaism Accept the Christian Messiah? (Volume 1), by Tovia Singer (RNBN), 
 Let's Get Biblical!: Why doesn't Judaism Accept the Christian Messiah? (Volume 2), by Tovia Singer (RNBN), 
 Evangelizing the chosen people: missions to the Jews in America, 1880–2000 by Ariel, Yaakov Shalom (The University of North Carolina Press) 
 Evangelizing the Chosen People: Missions to the Jews in America, by Ariel, Yaakov Shalom (the University of North Carolina Press), 
 Twenty-Six Reasons Why Jews Don't Believe in Jesus by Asher Norman (Black White and Read Publishing) 
 Why the Jews Rejected Jesus: The Turning Point in Western History by David Klinghoffer (Doubleday) 
 The Jewish response to missionaries: Counter-missionary handbook by Bentzion Kravitz (Jews for Judaism) ASIN: B0006RRKJG
 V'Da Mah SheTashiv: Know What To Answer (To Missionaries) A Thorough Jewish response To Missionaries by Ben Solomon (Outskirts Press)  Available on Amazan https://www.amazon.com/VDa-Mah-SheTashiv-Missionaries-Thorough/dp/1598009346 and Barnes and Noble http://search.barnesandnoble.com/Vda-Mah-Shetashiv/Ben-Soloman/e/9781598009347/?itm=1&USRI=mah+shetashiv web sites
 You Take Jesus, I'll Take God: How to Refute Christian Missionaries by Samuel Levine (Hamoroh Press) 
 Coming Full Circle: A Jewish Woman's Journey through Christianity and Back by Penina Taylor (Hatikva Books)

External links
 The Committee for Good Relations
 Judaism's Answer

Conversion of Jews to Christianity
Jewish apologetics
Jewish counter-missionaries
Jewish outreach
Anti-Judaism